The 1946 Slovenian Republic League was the 23rd season of the Slovenian Republic League and the first season as part of the country of SFR Yugoslavia. The league champions were Lendava.

Final table

Qualification for the Yugoslav First League

References

External links
Football Association of Slovenia 

Slovenian Republic Football League seasons
2
Football
Yugo